The Ndjim River is a river in Cameroon. It is a tributary of the Mbam River, and it is a part of the Sanaga River system. The river runs through Goura.

See also
 List of rivers of Cameroon

References

External links
 Geoview.info information

Rivers of Cameroon
Centre Region (Cameroon)